This article is about the history of Gondar, a city in Amhara Region of Ethiopia, and previously served as the capital of the Ethiopian Empire from 1632 (at the beginning of Gondarine period to 1855 (end of Zemene Mesafint) era.

17th century
Gondar was established in 1636 by Emperor Fasilides (r. 1632–1667) as a medieval capital of the Ethiopian Empire, and chosen for strategical seat of the government and its fertile lands surrounded by Dambia and Wegera. More significantly, the relatively stable phenomena in the seventeenth century northern and central Ethiopia, caravans from Sudan and the Red Sea converged on and dispersed to Gondar. The city also sustained urban center and long distance trade until the half of the nineteenth century.

Historian Bahru Zewde highlighted the significance of Gondar by French travellers as "the Paris of Abyssinia". Unlike most early modern cities of Ethiopia, Gondar was relatively peaceful and healthier, but there were reported contagious diseases such as malaria. The peaceful state of Gondar led to localities where caravans from Sudan and the Red Sea converged. Fasilides translocation from Danqaz to Gondar also contributed to trading benefits, despite Lent and rainy season prohibited expeditions that  made emperors to stay at the capital. Such incident quickly enabled him to prolong his reign and construct many buildings for the purpose of giving capital and additional reforms. He built 7 churches and the 5 emperors succeeded him aided to build several churches and palaces in what is called Fasil Ghebbi.

Like his father Emperor Susenyos I, Emperor Fasilides had similar policy to settle Oromo in several provinces of Gojjam, Begemder, Angot and Amhara; by accepting Orthodox Tewahedo, the Oromos were successfully integrated to Christian Amhara society.

18th century
Gondar prospered until the reign of Tekle Giyorgis (r. 1779–1784), appropriately nicknamed Fäsame Mängest ("the End of Government"). This period was characterized by glorious personalities of Emperors such as Iyasu I, Bakaffa, Mentewab, and Dawit III. All castles and churches were highly centralized for royal nobilities. The French Charles Poncet, who has served as physician of Iyasu, offers sketch of passage in the town at the end of seventeenth century. His third palace, Iyasu Palace also known as "Saddle on Horseback" resembles a saddle—to highlight the emperor's horsemanship. As a veteran of eleven battles and tax collector, Iyasu extended his boundary to Egypt, Yemen, and Sudan, and decorated his castle with ivory, mirrors, cedar, and a ceiling covered in gold leaf and precious stones.

After the death of Iyasu I death in 1706, Gondar became to decline because of most emperors preferred to enjoy luxurious life rather than spending in politics, giving the raise of Tigre Province such as the future capital Adwa in mid-eighteenth century. The event could lead of the ascension of major political figures in the period: Emperor Bakaffa and his widow Empress Mentewab and the first Tigre warlord Ras Mikael Sehul. However, the power was presided to Mentewab and the Amhara lords, where several members belonged to her family. They defended that the Empress should enthroned as Regent for her grandson as she had been for her son a decade and half earlier.

Mentewab brought her brother Ras Wolde Leul to Gondar and made him Ras Bitwaded. After the death of Iyasu II on 27 June 1755, Ras Mikael Sehul, who was on the way with guns, carpets, gold, silver and other tribute from Tigre, learnt the news two days later, when they arrived at Sembera Zagan in Wagara. Without any delay, he proceeded to the capital, arriving at morrow, he saw Iyasu II's son Iyoas I, who was child at the time of his reign.

On 7 September 1755, an agreement between the Empress and Mikael involving the marriage of his son Dejazmach Wolde Hawaryat to Mentewab's daughter Woizero Atlas can be seen as the path to supreme power to Gondar. Unbeknownst to him, Mentewab believed that Mikael could cooperate with her and merge their dynastic alliance without awareness of his power and wealth.  Their ceremony was described to be conducted by "great pomp" befitting with daughter of king and queen and "great enjoy" reigned in the House of Tigre ruler. According to chronicle, the marriage took place in Gondar, some three months after the death of Iyasu II and ascension of Iyoas.

In 1767, Ras Mikael Sehul seized Gondar by considering himself the real leader of the Gondarine period. In May 1769, Mikael killed Iyoas and crowned 70 years old Yohannes II, ushering in the decentralized Zemene Mesafint (Era of Prince) since then. Upon his arrival in 1770, Wolda Hawariat claimed that Gondar had an epidemic of smallpox, where the chief comes to he capital with "ill of fever".

19th century
By 1855, the country was called Europeans "Abyssinia" had been divided into four kingdoms, each autonomous. Gondar was surrounded by three provinces: Gojjam, Menz, and Tigre. Accusing Ras Ali II of being alienated to Muslim, Wube of Tigre roused his people against Gondar, and seized the town in 1841. Despite being excommunicated by the church, Ras Ali insisted fighting and attempted to enlist an outlaw named Kassa (future Tewodros II) to his cause. Kassa as the future Emperor of Ethiopia, considerate himself as descendant of both Solomon and Alexander the Great by responding fighting Ali. Through this time, Gondar resembled to base of operations rather than a capital, yet there was small European community with one of these was the British Consul, Charles Duncan Cameron.

Starting from Battle of Ayshal in 1852,  Kassa refused to order Ras Ali II, who controlled most princes and regions of northern Ethiopia, for his perennial military expedition against Gojjam. In response, Dejazmach Goshu Zewde of Gojjam, an ally of Ras Ali II, clashed with Kassa's army at the Battle of Gur Amba (27 November 1852). Ras Ali II left Gondar for Debre Tabor to call troops in rival provinces of Tigray, Wollo, Yejju. Afterward, he returned to Gondar where Kassa had occupied. In the Battle of Takusa (12 April 1853), Kassa pillaged Debre Tabor in 1852. On 29 June, Kassa proceeded destroying Ras Ali II's Oromo cavalry in one of costliest battles during the Zemene Mesafint, where Ali II died in 1856 after retreating to Yejju.

There were constant rebellions against Tewodros II, notably by Amade Bashir in Wollo, Bezabeh, a Shewan local prince, declared his independence. In 1864, Tewedros violently sacked and burnt Gondar along with neighboring Dembiya in 1886, when his soldiers destroyed most churches in old capital.

In 1880s, Emperor Yohannes IV moved the capital from Gondar to Mekelle and chose it as an administrative center by ordering building construction, which was completed in 1886. In 1888, the Mahdist sacked the town at the Battle of Sar Weha, particularly directing their fury at the churches.

20th century
In early 1900s, Gondar and Asmara have been at the hand of Muslim and Christian merchants of Gondar. Merchants of Gondar and in Begemder were to find immediate sale for their merchandise. There were Italian representatives residing in Gondar; a merchant named Caremelli imported Italian cotton goods and distributed them in Gondar, and an Italian medical doctor gave free medical service to patients in Gondar. The Arab together Ethiopian Muslim merchants traded in rifles and revolvers.

The Italian enterprise in Italian Eritrea began Red Sea commerce instructed by Major Ciccodicola, the Italian Minister at Addis Ababa. Some two months, Major Ciccodicola communicated to Emperor Menelik II that Ferdinando Martini (1897–1907) to get permission for extending mule caravan road from Nuqara to Gondar. He also added that at the completion of the road, it would be owned by the Ethiopian government.

In 1930, revolts occurred in Gondar just before Emperor Haile Selassie inauguration were clear attempt to prevent his rule over the area.  Haile Selassie then imposed central government in Gondar and Tigray which met resistance to topple the government. On 1 April 1936, the Italian troops occupied Gondar and within two years, 2,000 Europeans lived in the city. On 13–17 November 1941, the British and Italian military fought in Gondar during the East African Campaign of World War II, marking the withdrawal of Italian force from Italian East Africa.

In 1944, attempt to introduce land taxes following the Italian evacuation of the area met with military opposition in Gondar and Tigray. By 1950s, the population of Gondar has been fallen to 13,000, with few churches remaining. Still, Gondar was important religious center, becoming poor town with few modern amenities. Gondar traded cotton, saddles, shoes, ornaments, and cloth with other regions of the Blue Nile, but otherwise cut off the world. In 1970s, Gondar and Welega were hit by severe drought while the hardest year was in 1983–86.

The 1974 revolution affected azmaris and social and economic life of Gondar, creating Ethiopian diaspora in various parts of the world. During the Ethiopian Civil War, the Tigray People's Liberation Front (TPLF) reported that they actively engaging war against the Derg regime of Mengistu Haile Mariam in the northern province of Gondar.

In February 1989, the Soviet refused to ship more arms, and series of defeat of the Derg evacuated the government from Tigray Province. The TPLF then assembled the Amhara Democratic Party which formed the Ethiopian People's Revolutionary Democratic Front (EPRDF) and their force advanced to Gondar and Wollo Province. Shortly, They cut Addis Ababa–Gondar road and put Gojjam at risk. On 23 February 1991, the EPRDF launched military offensive codenamed "Operation Tewodros" against government in Gondar. In May 1991, Gondar was occupied by EPRDF forces concurrently with Wollo, Tigray and Gojjam.

21st century
On 26 April 2022, at least three people killed in a Muslim funeral at Gondar.

References

Gondar
Amhara Region